Thief is a 2006 American thriller crime drama miniseries starring Andre Braugher as Nick Atwater, a master thief and leader of a heist crew, balancing his personal life with the planning of a major heist. It aired on FX from March 28 to May 2.

The pilot was originally ordered by FX back in 2002, but didn't move forward until Braugher signed on. Despite critical acclaim, the show failed to garner significant ratings and FX declined to extend the series.

Each episode features a different song performed by multiple Grammy Award nominee Anthony Hamilton.

Cast and characters 
Andre Braugher as Nick Atwater
Mae Whitman as Tammi Deveraux
Malik Yoba as Elmo "Mo" Jones
Yancey Arias as Gabriel "Gabo" Williams
Clifton Collins Jr. as Jack Hill

Episodes

Awards and nominations 
On August 27, 2006, at the 58th Primetime Emmy Awards, Andre Braugher won the Primetime Emmy Award for Outstanding Lead Actor in a Miniseries or Movie for his portrayal of Nick Atwater, the second career Emmy for Braugher. Clifton Collins, Jr. was also nominated for his portrayal of Jack Hill for Outstanding Supporting Actor in a Miniseries or Movie.

Braugher also received a nomination for the Golden Globe Award for Best Actor – Miniseries or Television Film.

References

External links 
 
 FX getting a dramatic kick(Variety) 

2006 American television series debuts
2006 American television series endings
2000s American crime television series
2000s American television miniseries
2000s American mystery television series
English-language television shows
FX Networks original programming
Heist fiction
Primetime Emmy Award-winning television series
Television series by 20th Century Fox Television
Television shows set in Louisiana